Sara Alba (born 1968) is a Spanish politician from the La Rioja. A member of the Socialist Party, she served as Minister of Health in the Government of Concha Andreu from 30 August 2019 until her dismissal in January 2022.

References 

Living people
1968 births
Health ministers of Spanish autonomous communities
Politicians from La Rioja
21st-century Spanish politicians
21st-century Spanish women politicians
Women government ministers of Spain
Spanish Socialist Workers' Party politicians